Shaghap is a village in the Vedi Municipality of the Ararat Province of Armenia.

References 

Populated places in Ararat Province